Shmuel Agmon (born 2 February 1922) is an Israeli mathematician. He is known for his work in analysis and partial differential equations.

Biography
Shmuel Agmon was born in Tel Aviv to writer Nathan Agmon and Chaya Gutman, and spent the first years of his life in Nazareth. A member of the HaMahanot HaOlim youth movement, Agmon studied at the Gymnasia Rehavia and joined a hakhshara program at Kibbutz Na'an after graduating from high school.

He began his studies in mathematics at the Hebrew University of Jerusalem in 1940, but enlisted in the Jewish Brigade of the British Army before graduating. He served for four years in Cyprus, Italy and Belgium during World War II.

After his discharge, he completed his undergraduate and master's degrees at the Hebrew University and went to France for further studies. He obtained a Ph.D. from Paris-Sorbonne University in 1949, under the supervision of Szolem Mandelbrojt. He returned to Jerusalem after working as a visiting scholar at Rice University from 1950 to 1952, and was appointed full professor at the Hebrew University in 1959.

Work
Agmon's contributions to partial differential equations include Agmon's method for proving exponential decay of eigenfunctions for elliptic operators.

Awards
Agmon was awarded the 1991 Israel Prize in mathematics. He received the 2007 EMET Prize "for paving new paths in the study of partial-elliptical differential equations and their problematic language and for advancing the knowledge in the field, as well as his essential contribution to the development of the Spectral Theory and the Distribution Theory of Schrödinger Operators." He has also received the Weizmann Prize and the Rothschild Prize. In 2012 he became a fellow of the American Mathematical Society.

Selected works

with Lipman Bers: 

;

See also
Agmon's inequality

External links

References

1922 births
Living people
20th-century Israeli mathematicians
21st-century  Israeli mathematicians
Fellows of the American Mathematical Society
Einstein Institute of Mathematics alumni
Academic staff of the Hebrew University of Jerusalem
Israel Prize in mathematics recipients
Mathematical analysts
Members of the Israel Academy of Sciences and Humanities
Paris-Sorbonne University alumni
PDE theorists
Rice University faculty